Sir Kenneth Michael Wilford (31 January 1922 – 28 June 2006) was a British diplomat. He served as the British Ambassador to Japan from 1975 to 1980.

Early life 
Wilford was born in Wellington, New Zealand on 31 January 1922, where his father was working as an engineer. After his parents separated, he  moved to Dublin where he attended Castle Park Prep School. Returning to England, he was educated at Wrekin College in Wellington, Shropshire. He read mechanical sciences at Pembroke College, Cambridge, playing for the university at both golf and cricket, before his studies were interrupted in 1940. Called up for military service, he joined the Royal Engineers and became a captain, taking part in the Normandy landings as a member of the Guards Armoured Division. At the end of the war he returned to the University of Cambridge to complete his degree.

Career 
Wilford joined the Foreign Service in 1947. His first posting was at the commission in Berlin in 1947. He worked in Singapore from 1955 to 1959, where he began to develop an interest in East Asian politics and economics.

Wilford spent part of his career working in the private offices of five Foreign Secretaries, including Selwyn Lloyd from 1959 to 1960. After working as private secretary to Edward Heath, then Lord Privy Seal, he was posted to Rabat in 1962, followed by Beijing, Hong Kong and Washington.

In 1975 he became the British Ambassador to Japan, a role in which he served until his retirement in 1980.

Personal life 
In 1944 Wilford married Joan Law, a wireless operator at the Women's Royal Naval Service. They had three daughters.

Wilford played golf as a hobby. He died on 28 June 2006, aged 84.

References 

1922 births
2006 deaths
Ambassadors of the United Kingdom to Japan
People from Wellington City
20th-century British diplomats
People educated at Wrekin College
Alumni of Pembroke College, Cambridge
Royal Engineers officers
British Army personnel of World War II